Dick Hall may refer to:
Dick Hall (baseball) (born 1930), Major League Baseball pitcher and part-time outfielder
Dick Hall (soccer) (born 1945), English retired-American Association football defender
Dick Hall (Australian footballer) (1872–1906), Australian rules footballer
Dick Hall (writer) (1937–2003), Australian writer
Dick Wick Hall (1877–1926), American humorist

See also  
Richard Hall (disambiguation)